Uljas Vikström (3 March 1910, Turku – 17 April 1977, Petrozavodsk) was a Finnish writer, translator and editor, who lived in the Soviet Union.

According to his family Vikström fled to Russia after the victory of the Whites in the Finnish Civil War. Vikström graduated in 1933 Leningrad communist university of journalists and 1935 the Communist University of the National Minorities of the West. He began his career of writing in 1934. He worked for many years as the editor-in-chief of the newspaper Punalippu and translated a number of books by Soviet authors into Finnish.

Vikström was the chairman of the Karelian Union of Writers from 1971 to 1975, and in 1968 was awarded the title of an honorary cultural figure of the Karelian ASSR.

Works 
Uusia ystäviä, a play, 1950
Käy eespäin väki voimakas… 1956
Suvelan Osku, 1961
Toiska, a narration about the life of Toivo Antikainen, 1969
Torpeedo, a narration about the life of Otto Wille Kuusinen, 1972
Hajamuistoja, 1978

Sources
Karjalan suomenkieliset kirjailijat: Uljas Vikström (1910–1977)
Uljas Vikströmin muistokirjoitus Neuvosto-Karjala-lehdessä 20.4.1977

1910 births
1977 deaths
20th-century dramatists and playwrights
Recipients of the Order of the Red Banner of Labour
Recipients of the Order of the Red Star
Finnish dramatists and playwrights
Finnish male writers
Finnish translators
Soviet dramatists and playwrights
Soviet male writers
Soviet translators